Ay Ay Ay may refer to:

 Ay Ay Ay (album), an album by Los Piojos
 "Ay Ay Ay" (song), a 1913 song by Osmán Pérez Freire

See also
AYAYAY!
"Como la Flor, Selena song with a-a-ay lyrics
"Aiaiai"
"Ai Ai Ai ni Utarete Bye Bye Bye"
Ay ay ay ay (disambiguation)